FCH and double SH3 domains protein 2 is a protein that in humans is encoded by the FCHSD2 gene.

Interactions 

FCHSD2 has been shown to interact with MAGI1 and C2orf73.

References

Further reading